Peter Robinson is a British music journalist. He is the creator of the pop music-based blog Popjustice. Robinson self-published the biography/fanzine of The KLF, Justified and Ancient History. He is also the author of three other books: The Official Story and On Tour for UK pop band Busted, and also the author of the tie-in book to UK reality TV show Popstars: The Rivals.

See also

 Wonky pop

References

1977 births
Living people
British music journalists
Melody Maker writers